Katherine Quaye (born 1963), better known by her stage name Taffy, is an English hi-NRG and Italo disco singer from Deptford, London, best known for her 1980s hit, "I Love My Radio".

The song, produced by Claudio Cecchetto, who was also behind all her previous hits in Italy, was released in the United Kingdom by Rhythm King's Transglobal Records (both part of Mute Records in those days) and was originally a hit in Italy in 1985. The song's sentiments were about a disc jockey broadcasting in the early hours. However as very few radio stations in the United Kingdom broadcast after midnight in the late 1980s, this reference in the record was changed. A re-recorded version called "I Love My Radio (Dee Jay's Radio)" was released instead. This is the version that reached No. 6 in the UK Singles Chart.

"Step by Step", a Silver Pozzoli cover, was a minor hit in the UK reaching No. 59. Taffy also sang in Ferry Aid's charity cover of "Let It Be" (1987).

Singles
 "White & Black" (1982/1986)
 "Walk into the Daylight" (1984/1985) (Italy #20)
 "I Love My Radio (Midnight Radio)" (12" single) (1985), Ibiza/Break Records (Italy No. 5, Germany #35)
 "Once More" (1985/1986) (Italy #3)
 "I Love My Radio (Dee Jay's Radio)" (1986), Transglobal Records (UK #6)
 "Step by Step" (1987), Transglobal Records (UK No. 59, Italy #42)
 "Whose?" (1987)
 "If You Feel It" (1988)

References

1963 births
Living people
20th-century Black British women singers
British hi-NRG musicians
British Italo disco musicians
Singers from London
People from Deptford
Atco Records artists